The enzyme cysteine-S-conjugate β-lyase (EC 4.4.1.13) catalyzes the chemical reaction

an L-cysteine-S-conjugate + H2O = a thiol + NH3 + pyruvate (overall reaction)
(1a) an L-cysteine-S-conjugate = a thiol + 2-aminoprop-2-enoate
(1b) 2-aminoprop-2-enoate = 2-iminopropanoate (spontaneous)
(1c) 2-iminopropanoate + H2O = pyruvate + NH3 (spontaneous)

This enzyme belongs to the family of lyases, specifically the class of carbon-sulfur lyases. The systematic name of this enzyme class is L-cysteine-S-conjugate thiol-lyase (deaminating; pyruvate-forming). Other names in common use include cysteine conjugate β-lyase, glutamine transaminase K/cysteine conjugate β-lyase, and L-cysteine-S-conjugate thiol-lyase (deaminating). It employs one cofactor, pyridoxal phosphate.

Structural studies

References

 

EC 4.4.1
Pyridoxal phosphate enzymes
Enzymes of known structure